Saint-Mathieu-de-Beloeil is a municipality in southwestern Quebec, Canada, east of Montreal in the Regional County Municipality of La Vallée-du-Richelieu. The population as of the 2021 Canadian Census was 2,952.

Demographics

Population
Population trend:

Language
Mother tongue language (2021)

Education

The South Shore Protestant Regional School Board previously served the municipality.

See also
List of municipalities in Quebec

References

Municipalities in Quebec
Incorporated places in La Vallée-du-Richelieu Regional County Municipality
Greater Montreal